The Battle of Thermopylae was a battle fought in 480 BC during the Persian Wars.

Battle of Thermopylae may also refer to:

 Battle of Thermopylae (323 BC), a battle during the Lamian War between a coalition of Greek cities under Leosthenes and a Macedonian army led by Antipater
 Battle of Thermopylae (279 BC), the defense of the pass by the Greeks during Brennus' invasion of Greece
 Battle of Thermopylae (191 BC), an important battle where Roman forces defeated the Seleucid King Antiochus III the Great
 Battle of Thermopylae (254), the successful defense of the pass by local forces during an invasion of the Balkans by the Goths
 Battle of Thermopylae (1941), fought between the Germans and the retreating ANZACs during the German invasion of Greece

See also
 The 353 BC blocking of the pass during the Third Sacred War by the Phocian allied Athenians against Philip II of Macedon
 Battle of Alamana (1821), near Thermopylae during the Greek War of Independence